Roberto "Mucho" Frigerio (born 16 May 1938 in Le Havre, France) is a retired Swiss professional football forward who played for Switzerland in the 1962 FIFA World Cup.

Frigerio played youth football for FC Chiasso. Aged just 16 years old he made his Nationalliga A debut with Chiaso. In the summer of 1956 he transferred to FC Schaffhausen and stayed with them for two seasons.

Frigerio joined Basel's first team for their 1958–59 season und manager Rudi Strittich. After playing in five test games, Frigerio played his domestic league debut for his new club in the away game on 31 August 1958 as Basel were beaten 2–1 by La Chaux-de-Fonds. He scored his first league goal for his club on 28 December in the away game as Basel won 1–0 against Lugano. In the following season, on 20 March 1960 he scored his first hat-trick for Basel as they won the away league game 3–2 against Zürich.

After two season with Basel, Frigerio moved on to play for La Chaux-de-Fonds, where he also played for two seasons. Again he moved on, this time to Lausanne-Sport. Frigerio played here for 18 months and in the winter break of Basel's 1963–64 season he returned to his former club.

A well-documented curiosity was the fact that during the winter break of their 1963–64 season the team travelled on a world tour. This saw them visit British Hong Kong, Malaysia, Singapore, Australia, New Zealand, French Polynesia, Mexico and the United States. First team manager Jiří Sobotka together with 16 players and 15 members of staff, supporters and journalists participated in this world tour from 10 January to 10 February 1964. Team captain Bruno Michaud filmed the events with his super-8 camara. The voyage around the world included 19 flights and numerous bus and train journeys. Club chairman, Lucien Schmidlin, led the group, but as they arrived in the hotel in Bangkok, he realised that 250,000 Swiss Francs were missing. The suitcase that he had filled with the various currencies was not with them. He had left it at home, but fortunately Swiss Air were able to deliver this to him within just a few days. During the tour a total of ten friendly/test games were played, these are listed in their 1963–64 season. Five wins, three draws, two defeats, but also three major injuries resulted from these test matches. A broken leg for Peter Füri, an eye injury for Walter Baumann and a knee injury for Bruno Michaud soon reduced the number of players to just 13. Frigerio was a member of this tour. He played in 10 of these games and scored 10 goals.

Frigerio won the Swiss championship title in Basel's 1966–67 season. Basel finished the championship one point clear of FC Zürich who finished in second position. Basel won 16 of the 26 games, drawing eight, losing twice, and they scored 60 goals conceding just 20. Frigerio was the team's top goal scorer with 16 league goals.

In that season Frigerio won the double with Basel. In the Cup final on 15 May 1967 Basel's opponents were Lausanne-Sports. In the former Wankdorf Stadium, Helmut Hauser scored the decisive goal via penalty. The game went down in football history due to the sit-down strike that followed this goal. After 88 minutes of play, with the score at 1–1, referee Karl Göppel awarded Basel a controversial penalty. André Grobéty had pushed Hauser gently in the back and Hauser let himself drop theatrically. Subsequently, after the 2–1 lead for Basel the Lausanne players refused to resume the game and they sat down demonstratively on the pitch. The referee had to abandon the match. Basel were awarded the cup with a 3–0 forfait.

Between the years 1958 to 1960 and again from 1963 to 1968, Frigerio played a total of 256 games for Basel scoring a total of 176 goals. 144 of these games were in the Nationalliga A, 23 in the Swiss Cup, 18 in the european competitions (Cup of the Alps, Inter-Cities Fairs Cup, European Cup) and 71 were friendly games. He scored 74 goals in the domestic league, 22 in the Swiss Cup, 7 in the european competitions and the other 73 were scored during the test games. The highest number of goals that he scored for Basel in a league match was four and this was on 29 October 1966 in the home game at the Landhof as Basel won 10–0 against FC Moutier. The highest number of goals that he scored for Basel in a test match was six. This was achieved twice, on 16.02.1966 in a 9-0 victory against Black Stars and in July by another 9–0 victory against local club FC Allschwil.

Following his time in Basel, Frigerio moved on to play three seasons for Bellinzona and then he moved on to play for US Gambarogno, in a lower tier of Swiss football, where he ended his active football career.

Honours
La Chaux-de-Fonds
 Swiss Cup: 1960–61
Basel
 Swiss League: 1966–67
 Swiss Cup: 1966–67

Sources and references
 Rotblau: Jahrbuch Saison 2015/2016. Publisher: FC Basel Marketing AG. 
 Switzerland 1966–67 at RSSSF

1938 births
Swiss men's footballers
Switzerland international footballers
Association football forwards
FC Chiasso players
FC Schaffhausen players
FC Basel players
FC La Chaux-de-Fonds players
FC Lausanne-Sport players
AC Bellinzona players
1962 FIFA World Cup players
Living people